Illinois is a state in the United States.

Illinois may also refer to:

Places
 Illinois Country, a region of colonial America
 Illinois County, Virginia, a county claimed by Virginia during the American Revolutionary War
 Illinois Territory, an organized territory of the US from 1809 to 1818
 Illinois River, a tributary of the Mississippi River in the state of Illinois
 Illinois River (Colorado)
 Illinois River (Oklahoma) in Arkansas and Oklahoma
 Illinois River (Oregon)
 Illinois Township, Pope County, Arkansas

Education
 University of Illinois Urbana-Champaign, the largest campus in the University of Illinois system
 Illinois Fighting Illini, this school's intercollegiate athletic program
 Illinois College, a private liberal arts college located in Jacksonville, Illinois

Ships
 SS Illinois (1873), an American Line passenger steamship
 SS Illinois (1917), a cargo ship in service with the Harlem Steamship Co and Compagnie Générale Transatlantique
 USS Illinois (BB-7), the lead ship of Illinois-class battleship, launched in 1898
 USS Illinois (BB-65), a former planned Iowa-class battleship
 USS Illinois (SSN-786), a Virginia-class submarine, launched 2016
 Battleship Illinois (replica), a full-scale mockup of an Indiana-class battleship

Transportation
 Illinois station (DART), a DART Light Rail station in Dallas, US
 Illinois Terminal, in Champaign, Illinois, US

Music
 Illinois (band), an American indie rock band
 Illinois (Sufjan Stevens album), a 2005 album by Sufjan Stevens
 Illinois (Brett Eldredge album), a 2015 album by Brett Eldredge
 "Illinois" (song), the state song of Illinois with words by C.H. Chamberlain and music by Archibald Johnston

Other uses
 Illinois Jacquet (1922–2004), jazz saxophone player
 Illinois Confederation, a group of Native American tribes
 The Illinois, a proposed mile-high skyscraper building designed in 1956

See also
 Illinois City, Illinois, unincorporated community
 Illinoi, Illinois and Indiana, unincorporated community
 Miami-Illinois, a Native American Algonquian language